The All Nepal Football Association (ANFA) (Nepali: अखिल नेपाल फुटबल संघ (एन्फा)) is the governing body of football in Nepal. It is responsible for the national team as well as club competitions. The organisation was founded in 1951 as the All Nepal Football Association and became affiliated with FIFA in 1972. The current President of ANFA is Pankaj Bikram Nembang. Its current headquarters is located in the ANFA House in ANFA Complex, Satdobato.

History

Pre-ANFA (1921–1950) 
The entry and initial start-up of football came in Nepal during the Rana regime in 1921. The game was introduced in Nepal by the young players who had learnt this game from other countries. Games was watched by a huge mass of audience and became very famous at that time. However, it is believed that the pioneer of this game in Nepal was Narayan Narsingh Rana of Thamel and Chandrajung Thapa of Naxal.

There were some places, which were used as football ground for palace teams, such as Sujan Khanal, Mrigendra Shamsher Niwas Babarmahal, Mahabir Niwas Tangal Palace, Narshamsher Niwas Singha Durbar, Rudra Shamsher Niwas Bhahadur Bhavan, and Thamel Narsingh camp. Whereas in the decade of 1930s, both local and palace teams commonly used the grounds of Singhdarbar, Chhauni, Gaucharan, Jawalakhel and Lainchaur for playing football. Despite political instability at that time football was played enthusiastically during 1921 to 1990 by various teams without goal posts, but the criterion was that the opponent team could follow the ball to the goal line.

Formation of the FA (1288)

Development 
Football development in Nepal had only been possible when ANFA started working from root level. Keeping this in mind, ANFA has given its work priority for building fundamental material for the association. Firstly, ANFA has built a hostel in Satdobato, Lalitpur which has shown their dedication toward the development of football in Nepal by opening an ANFA office with a playground. This work of ANFA has been appreciated everywhere. Before starting a major project, the Federation of International Football Association (FIFA) provided ANFA an opportunity to represent as a model in FIFA congress. ANFA has built technical centers (or football academies) in Chyasal of Lalitpur, Butwal, Rupandehi, Sunsari and Dharan under the roof of the FIFA Goal project. Similarly, ANFA has planned to open technical centers in the Mid-Western and Far-Western development regions of Nepal in the future.

Competitions 
ANFA also runs several competitions:

 Martyr's Memorial A-Division League
 Martyr's Memorial B-Division League
 Martyr's Memorial C-Division League
 Nepal Super League
 National League
 'A' Division National Futsal League
ANFA President's League
 Province League
 District League
 Lalit Memorial U-18 Tournament
 Vice President Women's National League
 Inter-School National Tournament

District federations 
There are currently 48 district associations affiliated with the All Nepal Football Association.

 Baglung District Football Association
 Banke District Football Association
 Bara District Football Association
 Bardiya District Football Association
 Bhaktapur District Football Association
 Bhojpur District Football Association
 Chitwan District Football Association
 Dang District Football Association
 Dhading District Football Association
 Dhankuta District Football Association
 Dhanusha District Football Association
 Dolakaha District Football Association
 Gorkha District Football Association
 Ilam District Football Association
 Jhapa District Football Association
 Jumla District Football Association
 Kailali District Football Association
 Kanchanpur District Football Association
 Kaski District Football Association
 Kathmandu District Football Association
 Kavre District Football Association
 Khotang District Football Association
 Lalitpur District Football Association
 Lamjung District Football Association
 Mahottari District Football Association
 Manang District Football Association
 Makwanpur District Football Association
 Morang District Football Association
 Nawalparasi District Football Association
 Nawalpur District Football Association
 Nuwakot District Football Association
 Palpa District Football Association
 Panchthar District Football Association
 Parsa District Football Association
 Rautahat District Football Association
 Rupandehi District Football Association
 Sankhuwasabha District Football Association
 Saptari District Football Association
 Sarlahi District Football Association
 Syangja District Football Association
 Sindhuli District Football Association
 Sindhupalchowk District Football Association
 Siraha District Football Association
 Sunsari District Football Association
 Surkhet District Football Association
 Tanahu District Football Association
 Taplejung District Football Association
 Udayapur District Football Association

Executive committee

See also
 Football in Nepal
 ANFA Cup
 Nepal national football team

References

External links
 All Nepal FA site
 Nepal at the FIFA website.
 Nepal at AFC site

 
1
1951 establishments in Nepal
Sports organizations established in 1951
Sports governing bodies in Nepal
Nepal